2020 BDO & WDF season of darts comprises every tournament of British Darts Organisation and World Darts Federation. The category or prize money of the tournaments may be vary depending on darts organization.

BDO and WDF most important tournaments are the BDO World Darts Championship and WDF World Cup.

Tournament categories, points & prize money

BDO

WDF

Calendar

January

February

March

April

May

June

July

August

September

October

November

December

Statistical information

The players/nations are sorted by:
 Total number of titles;
 Cumulated importance of those titles;
 Alphabetical order (by family names for players).

ø symbol stands for a both BDO and WDF sanctioned tournament, meaning that only a 1 title is accounted. When a BDO-WDF sanctioned tournament, highest category priority.

Key

Titles won by player (men's)

Titles won by nation (men's)

Titles won by player (women's)

Titles won by nation (women's)

References

External links
2020 BDO calendar
2020 WDF calendar

2020 in darts
British Darts Organisation tournaments